NMTB may refer to:

Music
 Never Mind the Buzzcocks, a music-based comedy quiz programme on BBC Two
 Never Mind the Bollocks, Here's the Sex Pistols, an album by the Sex Pistols

Machine tools
 Association for Manufacturing Technology, formerly the National Machine Tool Builders Association
 Machine taper#NMTB tapers a standard CNC taper, promulgated by the former National Machine Tool Builders Association